Dalseong Park is a park located in Jung-gu, Daegu, South Korea. The park includes Gwanpungnu Pavilion, a local history hall, a zoo, and some monuments.

History

The park is located inside the oldest earthen fortification in Korea, dating from about 261 C.E. (during the three kingdoms period). During the Sino-Japanese war in 1894-1895 the land was used as a Japanese military base. The park was created in 1905, and was renovated to its current form in 1965.

Dalseong Park Zoo

Animals at the zoo include Asian elephants, peacocks, Bengal tigers, a brown bear, llamas, pheasants, vultures, owls, monkeys, zebras, wolves, and a jaguar.

Notes

Jung District, Daegu
Zoos in South Korea
Parks in Daegu
City walls in South Korea
Historic Sites of South Korea
Castles in South Korea